Baliqchi (also Romanized as Bālīqchī; also known as Bāleqchī) is a village in Beygom Qaleh Rural District, in the Central District of Naqadeh County, West Azerbaijan Province, Iran. At the 2006 census, its population was 758, in 166 families.

References 

Populated places in Naqadeh County